Paul Bloch (July 17, 1939 – May 25, 2018) was an American publicist. He was the chairman of Rogers & Cowan, and he represented many celebrities.

Early life
Bloch was born on July 17, 1939 in Brooklyn, New York City, New York. He was educated at the University High School in Los Angeles, and he graduated from the University of California, Los Angeles (UCLA), where he earned a bachelor's degree in Political Science in 1962.

Career
Bloch began his career at Rogers & Cowan in 1961. He initially worked in the mailroom, and later became the head of the music department. By the time of his death, he was chairman. Over the course of his career, he represented many celebrities, including Victoria Beckham, Kevin Costner, Tom Cruise, Farrah Fawcett, Barry Gibb, Anthony Hopkins, Michael Keaton, Eddie Murphy, Nick Nolte, Lisa Marie Presley, Diana Ross, Sharon Stone, and John Travolta.

Bloch received the Les Mason Award from the International Cinematographers Guild in 1991. He was the namesame of the Paul Bloch Salad at The Palm.

Death
Bloch died on May 25, 2018 at Cedars-Sinai Medical Center in Los Angeles.

References

1939 births
2018 deaths
People from Brooklyn
People from Los Angeles
University High School (Los Angeles) alumni
University of California, Los Angeles alumni
Businesspeople from California
American publicists
Burials at Westwood Village Memorial Park Cemetery
20th-century American businesspeople